Delia (also ) is a municipality (comune, cumune) in the province of Caltanissetta in the Italian region Sicily, located about  southeast of Palermo and about  southwest of Caltanissetta.

Delia borders the following municipalities: Caltanissetta, Canicattì, Naro.

Demographic evolution

Twin Cities
 Vaughan, Ontario, Canada

References

External links
 www.comune.delia.cl.it/

Cities and towns in Sicily